Tennis was part of the Southeast Asian Games from the inaugural  1959 Southeast Asian Peninsular Games It has been played at each edition of the games with the exception of 2013 Southeast Asian Games.

Edition

South East Asian Peninsular Games

Southeast Asian Games

Medal table

Medalists

Men

Singles

Doubles

Team

Women

Singles

Doubles

Team

Mixed doubles

References

Page 24
Page 27
Page 56
Page 23
Page 13
Page 98
Page 31

 
Southeast Asian Games